The Sun (XIX) is the nineteenth trump or Major Arcana card in most traditional tarot decks. It is used in game playing as well as in divination.

Description 
An infant rides a white horse under the anthropomorphized Sun, with sunflowers in the background.

Rider–Waite symbolism
A. E. Waite suggested that this card is associated with attained knowledge. The child of life holds a red flag, representing the blood of renewal while a smiling sun shines down on him, representing accomplishment. The conscious mind prevails over the fears and illusions of the unconscious. Innocence is renewed through discovery, bringing hope for the future.

Interpretation 
This card is generally considered positive. It is said to reflect happiness and contentment, vitality, self-confidence and success. Sometimes referred to as the best card in tarot, it represents good things and positive outcomes to current struggles.

Waite suggests the card carries several divinatory associations:

19.THE SUN.—Material happiness, fortunate marriage, contentment. Reversed: The same in a lesser sense.

References

Bibliography

External links 

 The symbolism of The Sun - how to interpret this card
 The Sun Tarot Card Explained | Upright & Reversed Meanings

Major Arcana
Sun in art